Maxim Focșa (born 21 April 1992) is a Moldovan footballer who plays as a defender for Dacia Buiucani.

Club career
In 2018, Focșa played for Maltese club Pembroke Athleta.

On 4 March 2022, Dordoi Bishkek announced the signing of Focșa.

International career
He made his debut for the Moldova national team on 17 November 2019 in a Euro 2020 qualifier against Iceland.

References

External links
 
 
 

1992 births
Living people
Footballers from Chișinău
Moldovan footballers
Association football defenders
FC Academia Chișinău players
FC Dinamo-Auto Tiraspol players
Valletta F.C. players
Balzan F.C. players
CS Petrocub Hîncești players
CSF Bălți players
Pembroke Athleta F.C. players
FC Sfîntul Gheorghe players
Ma'an SC players
FC Slutsk players
FC Dordoi Bishkek players
Dacia Buiucani players
Moldovan Super Liga players
Maltese Premier League players
Jordanian Pro League players
Moldova international footballers
Moldovan expatriate footballers
Moldovan expatriate sportspeople in Malta
Moldovan expatriate sportspeople in Jordan
Moldovan expatriate sportspeople in Belarus
Moldovan expatriate sportspeople in Kyrgyzstan
Expatriate footballers in Malta
Expatriate footballers in Jordan
Expatriate footballers in Belarus
Expatriate footballers in Kyrgyzstan